This is a list of positron emission tomography (PET) radiotracers. These are chemical compounds in which one or more atoms have been replaced by a short-lived, positron emitting radioisotope.

Cardiology

[15O] water
[13N] ammonia
[82Rb] Rubidium-82 chloride
[11C] Acetate (Also used in oncology)

Neurology

[11C] 25B-NBOMe (Cimbi-36)
[18F] Altanserin
[11C] Carfentanil
[11C] DASB
[11C] DTBZ or [18F]Fluoropropyl-DTBZ
[11C] [11C] ME@HAPTHI 
[18F] Fallypride
[18F] Florbetaben
[18F] Flubatine
[18F] Fluspidine
[18F] Florbetapir
[18F] or [11C] Flumazenil
[18F] Flutemetamol
[18F] Fluorodopa
[18F] Desmethoxyfallypride
[18F] Mefway
[18F] MPPF
[18F] Nifene
[11C] Pittsburgh compound B
[11C] Raclopride
[18F] Setoperone
[18F] or [11C] N-Methylspiperone
[11C] Verapamil
NIMH maintains a list of CNS radiotracers that may be useful for additional information.

Neuroepigenetics
 [11C] Martinostat

Oncology
[18F] Fludeoxyglucose (18F) (FDG)-glucose analogue
[11C] Acetate
[11C] Methionine
[11C] choline
[18F] EF5
[18F] Fluciclovine
[18F] Fluorocholine
[18F] FET
[18F] FMISO
[18F] Fluorothymidine F-18
[64Cu] Cu-ETS2
[64Cu] Copper-64 DOTA-TATE
[68Ga] DOTA-pseudopeptides
[68Ga] DOTA-TATE
[68Ga] PSMA
[68Ga] CXCR4; solid and hematologic cancers

Infectious diseases
[18F] Fluorodeoxysorbitol (FDS)

Further reading
CNS Radiotracers that have been advanced for use in Human Studies

References

Neuroimaging
PET radiotracers